Cirratulida is an order of polychaetes belonging to the class Polychaeta.

Families:
 Cirratulidae Carus, 1863
 Paraonidae Cerruti, 1909

References

Polychaetes